The white-margin fin smooth-hound (Mustelus albipinnis) is a smooth-hound from the Gulf of California, off the coast of Mexico. The white-margin fin smooth-hound shark is slender, dark grey-brown in color, and grows up to 1.2 m (4 ft) long.

References
 
 

Mustelus
Endemic fish of Mexico
Fish of the Gulf of California
Fish described in 2005